J.H. (Joost) Möller (born May 20, 1967 in Eindhoven) is a Dutch politician of the People's Party for Freedom and Democracy (VVD).

Möller was a councillor of Tilburg from 1999 to 2008. Since 2008 he has been an alderman of this North Brabant municipality. From 2002 to 2010, he was also owner of an employment agency called Talentflex.

Möller studied business economics at Tilburg University.

References 
  Tilburg municipality

1967 births
Living people
20th-century Dutch politicians
21st-century Dutch businesspeople
21st-century Dutch politicians
Aldermen in North Brabant
Municipal councillors of Tilburg
People from Eindhoven
People's Party for Freedom and Democracy politicians
Tilburg University alumni